Algebra & Number Theory is a peer-reviewed mathematics journal published by the nonprofit organization Mathematical Sciences Publishers. It was launched on January 17, 2007, with the goal of "providing an alternative to the current range of commercial specialty journals in algebra and number theory, an alternative of higher quality and much lower cost."

The journal publishes original research articles in algebra and number theory, interpreted broadly, including algebraic geometry and arithmetic geometry, for example. ANT publishes high-quality articles of interest to a broad readership, at a level surpassing all but the top four or five generalist mathematics journals. Currently, it is regarded as the best journal specializing in number theory.
Issues are published both online and in print.

Editorial board 
The Managing Editor is Bjorn Poonen of MIT, and the Editorial Board Chair is David Eisenbud of U. C. Berkeley.

See also
 Jonathan Pila

References

External links 
 
 Mathematical Sciences Publishers

Mathematics journals
Publications established in 2007
Mathematical Sciences Publishers academic journals